Carpus is a Latin word for "wrist".

Carpus may also refer to:

 Carpus Loveland, American politician active in the 1870s
 Carpus of Antioch, ancient Greek mathematician
 Carpus of Beroea, friend of Paul the Apostle
 Saint Carpus, very early Christian martyr

See also
 Karpos, youth in Greek mythology famed for his beauty